WFWI is an FM radio station located in Fort Wayne, Indiana with a classic hits format. The station operates on the FM radio frequency of 92.3 MHz. The station's main competitor is WLDE.

History
WFWI began broadcasting in March 1993 with an adult contemporary format under the ownership of Russ Oasis and Steve Avellone, with Tony Coles as the first program director.

In early 1994, Oasis and Coles then changed the format to 1970s hits; shortly after, Coles left Fort Wayne for New York's WLTW and production director Keith Harris took over as WFWI's program director. Under Harris's tenure, the format was shifted to classic hits. On January 6, 1995, the Bob & Tom Show became the station's morning show.

In 1997, Federated Media purchased WFWI from Edgewater Radio. Following the sale, Federated Media shifted WFWI from a classic hits format to a classic rock format under the name "92.3 The Fort".

On March 15, 2012, Federated Media announced that 92.3 would begin simulcasting WOWO on April 1. The change was then moved up a few days to the 28th, and at Noon on that day, following a goodbye show for The Fort from the DJs of the station (who had previously announced that they and the format would move to an online webstream at TheFortRocks.com; the show ended with "Happy Trails" by Van Halen), 92.3 began simulcasting WOWO as "News/Talk WOWO, AM 1190 and FM 92.3". The same day, the callsign was changed to WOWO-FM.

On November 4, 2015, WOWO-FM changed their call letters back to WFWI. On December 14, WOWO began simulcasting on 107.5 W298BJ Fort Wayne; the simulcast would move to the frequency on January 1, 2016, as 92.3 began stunting with 2-minute clips of classic rock songs, with liners promoting to go to WePromiseSomethingBig.com, which had a timer counting down to Monday at 6AM, at which time 92.3 flipped to a classic hits/adult hits hybrid as "Big 92.3, Fort Wayne's Greatest Hits", playing hits from four decades (focusing on the late 1970s and early 1980s) and emphasizing that their stopsets won't last more than 2 minutes long.

References

External links

FWI
Radio stations established in 1993
Classic hits radio stations in the United States
1993 establishments in Indiana